Pace Murphy (born March 2, 1994) is an American football offensive tackle who is a free agent. He played college football for Northwestern State. He signed with the Los Angeles Rams as an undrafted free agent in 2016.

Professional career

Los Angeles Rams
On May 4, 2016, Murphy signed with the Los Angeles Rams as an undrafted free agent.

On September 2, 2017, Murphy was waived by the Rams.

San Francisco 49ers
On September 18, 2017, Murphy was signed to the San Francisco 49ers' practice squad. He signed a reserve/future contract with the 49ers on January 2, 2018. He was waived on August 31, 2018.

Kansas City Chiefs
On October 23, 2018, Murphy was signed to the Kansas City Chiefs practice squad. He signed a reserve/future contract with the Chiefs on January 23, 2019.

On August 31, 2019, Murphy was waived by the Chiefs.

Dallas Renegades
Murphy was drafted in the 2nd round in phase two in the 2020 XFL Draft by the Dallas Renegades. He had his contract terminated when the league suspended operations on April 10, 2020.

Dallas Cowboys
Murphy signed with the Dallas Cowboys on August 18, 2020. He was waived on September 2, 2020.

References

External links
 Northwestern State Demons bio

1994 births
Living people
Players of American football from Houston
American football offensive tackles
Northwestern State Demons football players
Los Angeles Rams players
San Francisco 49ers players
Kansas City Chiefs players
Dallas Renegades players
Dallas Cowboys players